Proposition 60 was an amendment of the Constitution of California, enacted in 2004, guaranteeing the right of a party participating in a primary election to also participate in the general election that follows. It was proposed by the California Legislature and approved by the voters in referendum held as part of the November 2004 election, by a majority of 67%.

Provisions

Proposition 60 related to partisan primary elections for statewide offices, as well as races for the state legislature, and the State Board of Equalization. It added to the state constitution  Article II, Section 5 (b), stating that

The official summary of the proposition stated

It was declared by the Legislative Analyst to have "no fiscal effect".

Process of enactment

In 2004 the state legislature proposed a constitutional amendment called Senate Constitutional Amendment 18. This contained provisions relating to both primary elections and funds from the sale of government property. This was to be put to voters as a single measure called Proposition 60. However Californians for an Open Primary challenged the measure as a violation of the rule that ballot propositions must deal with only a single subject. The group wished to have Proposition 60 removed from the ballot. Instead, in Californians for an Open Primary v. Shelley, the Third District Court of Appeals ordered that the proposition be split, so that the provisions relating to government property would become a separate measure, called Proposition 60A.

Proposition 60 (including the provisions later excised) was approved by the California State Senate by a vote of 28-3 and by the State Assembly by a by 55–21. On November 2, 2004 it was approved by voters by a majority of 5,806,708 (67.3%) "Yes" votes, to 2,829,284 (32.7%) "No" votes. Proposition 60A was also approved by voters.

References

External links
Full text of Proposition 60

60
2004